Terry Allen (born May 7, 1943) is an American musician and artist from Lubbock, Texas. Allen's musical career as a singer-songwriter has spanned many Texas country and outlaw country albums, and his work as a visual artist has included painting, conceptual art, performance, and sculpture, with a number of notable bronze sculptures installed publicly in various cities throughout the United States. He currently lives in Santa Fe, New Mexico. 

Allen has recorded twelve albums of original songs, including the landmark releases Juarez (1975) and Lubbock (On Everything) (1979). His song "Amarillo Highway" has been covered by Bobby Bare, Sturgill Simpson and Robert Earl Keen. Other artists who have recorded Allen's songs include Guy Clark, Little Feat, David Byrne, Doug Sahm, Ricky Nelson, and Lucinda Williams. Rolling Stone magazine describes his catalog, reaching back to Juarez as "..uniformly eccentric and uncompromising, savage and beautiful, literate and guttural."

Allen also works with a wide variety of media including musical and theatrical performances, sculpture, painting, drawing and video, and installations which incorporate any and all of these media. His work has been shown throughout the United States and internationally.

Early life
He was born in Wichita, Kansas, United States.
Allen's father was Fletcher ("Sled") Allen (August 23, 1886 in West Plains, Missouri – October 16, 1959 in Lubbock, Texas) a catcher in 1910 for the St. Louis Browns, who continued his career as a player-manager in the Texas League.

Allen attended Monterey High School in Lubbock, Texas. His contemporaries at Monterey High School included Butch Hancock, Jimmie Dale Gilmore, Joe Ely, Jo Harvey Allen and Jo Carol Pierce. Trained as an architect, he received a B.F.A. from the Chouinard Art Institute in 1966. After briefly teaching at his alma mater (1968-1969) and the University of California, Berkeley (1971), Allen served on the faculty of the California State University, Fresno as a guest lecturer (1971-1973), associate professor (1974-1977) and professor (1978-1979) of art before resigning his appointment to pursue other opportunities. His art has been supported by three National Endowment for the Arts grants and a prestigious Guggenheim Fellowship. His work Trees (the music, literary and third trees) is installed on the campus of the University of California, San Diego as part of the Stuart Collection. His artwork has been featured at the L.A. Louver art gallery in Venice, California.

Visual artist
His works are represented in the collections of many international museums including the New York Museum of Modern Art, the Detroit Institute of Arts, the Nelson-Atkins Museum of Art in Kansas City, the San Diego Museum of Contemporary Art, the Los Angeles County Museum of Art, the New York Metropolitan Museum of Art, Espace Lyonnais d'Art Contemporain, Musée Saint-Pierre, Lyon, France, the Houston Museum of Fine Arts, the San Francisco Museum of Modern Art, The Contemporary Austin, the Dallas Museum of Art, the Art Museum of Southeast Texas, and the Los Angeles Museum of Contemporary Art.

Kansas City, Missouri is home to both his controversial public sculpture "Modern Communication" as well as The Belger Collection which features Terry Allen as one of their seven "core artists".

Music
Allen began his musical career learning to play piano from his mother, Pauline Pierce Allen, who was a professional piano player. In 1962, while in High School, he wrote his first song, "Red Bird", which he would go on to perform live on Shindig! in 1965, and recorded on his 1980 album, Smokin' the Dummy.

In 1975, Allen released his debut, art-country album, Juarez, which is considered "one of the greatest concept albums of all time" according to PopMatters while Rolling Stone called it an "outlaw classic".

The 1979 follow up, was the groundbreaking, Lubbock (On Everything). His deeply moving and satirical lyrics capture his complex memory of growing up in his hometown of Lubbock, Texas. According to AllMusic, Lubbock (On Everything) is "one of the finest country albums of all time" and a progenitor of the alt-country movement. His song "New Delhi Freight Train", from Lubbock (On Everything), was first recorded by Little Feat in 1977 on their album, Time Loves a Hero. Guy Clark says, "It's such an interesting piece of work... It's the juxtaposition of the song."

In 1980, Allen released, Smokin' the Dummy, which he recorded with the Panhandle Mystery Band.

His 1983 album, Bloodlines, includes one of his most well-known songs, "Gimme a Ride to Heaven Boy", which [includes] themes of hitchhiking and the road.

In 1986, he collaborated with David Byrne on the soundtrack for Byrne's movie, True Stories.

Over the span of a decade (1985-1995), Allen released several avant-garde albums, Pedal Steal, Amerasia and Chippy (a collaboration with Joe Ely, Butch Hancock, Robert Earl Keen, Wayne Hancock), which crossover to visual, theatrical and musical medium interpretations.

In 1996, he released the country album, Human Remains, which features guest spots from David Byrne, Joe Ely, Charlie and Will Sexton and Lucinda Williams.

In 2007, Allen did a guest spot on the track "Ghost of Travelin' Jones" on Ryan Bingham's album, Mescalito.

Allen's 2013 album, Bottom of the World, features his Guy Clark co-write, "Queenie's Song", inspired by the death of his dog.

Discography
 Juarez (1975)
 Lubbock (On Everything) (1979)
 Smokin' the Dummy (1980)
 Bloodlines (1983)
 Pedal Steal (1985)
 Amerasia (1987)
 Silent Majority (Terry Allen's Greatest Missed Hits) (1992)
 Chippy (1995)
 Human Remains (1996)
 Salivation (1999)
 Live at Al's Grand Hotel. Recorded May 7, 1971 (2012)
 Bottom of the World (2013)
 Pedal Steal + Four Corners (2019)
 Just Like Moby Dick (2020)

References

Further reading
 Robert Faires, "Tale of a Tale spinner:How a ballplayer, a piano player, beatnik poetry, and Lubbock shaped Terry Allen as an epic storyteller", Austin Chronicle, December 19, 2003.
 Jason Gross, "Terry Allen Interview", Perfect Sound Forever, May 1998.
Chris Oglesby, Chris Oglesby Interviews Terry Allen above the Caravan of Dreams, Ft. Worth, virtualblock, March 26, 1998.

External links
 Terry Allen's website.
 Booking and tour information (music) from Davis McLarty Agency, Austin, Texas.
 Art exhibitions and sales from Gallery Paule Anglim, San Francisco, California.
 Dugout, a multimedia, multi-venue art exhibition and theatre program in Los Angeles. February – May 2004.
 Terry Allen's bio page at LA Louver gallery.
Oral history interview with Terry Allen, 1998 Apr. 22 from the Smithsonian Archives of American Art.

1943 births
Living people
Artists from Wichita, Kansas
American country singer-songwriters
American male singer-songwriters
Country musicians from Kansas
Chouinard Art Institute alumni
People from Lubbock, Texas
Musicians from Wichita, Kansas
Writers from Wichita, Kansas
Outlaw country singers
Singer-songwriters from Texas
Country musicians from Texas
Singer-songwriters from Kansas